The Ningpo Massacre was a massacre of Portuguese pirates by Cantonese pirates led by Ah Pak around the city of Ningbo. During the Qing dynasty, in the 19th century, the Ningbo authorities contracted Cantonese pirates to eliminate by extermination Portuguese pirates who raided Cantonese shipping around Ningbo. The campaign was "successful", with 40 Portuguese dead and only two Chinese dead, being dubbed "The Ningpo Massacre" by an English correspondent, who noted that the Portuguese pirates had behaved savagely towards the Chinese, and that the Portuguese authorities at Macau should have reined in the pirates.

Battle and Massacre
Portuguese pirates who raided Cantonese shipping in the early 19th century were eliminated by Cantonese forces around Ningbo.

The people from Ningbo supported the Cantonese massacre of the Portuguese pirates and the attack on the Portuguese consul. The Ningbo authorities had made an agreement with a Cantonese pirate named A'Pak to exterminate the Portuguese pirates. The Portuguese did not even try to fight when the Cantonese pirates sacked their consulate, fleeing and hiding among the tombs. The Cantonese butchered around 40 Portuguese while sacking the consulate. Only two Chinese and one Englishman who sided with the Cantonese died.

Further reading

(the University of California)
(the New York Public Library) Also available here
Original from the University of Wisconsin - Madison (eastern china mission - Letter from Mr. Kwolton)

References

1857 in China
1857 murders in China
Massacres in 1857
China–Portugal relations
Massacres in China
June 1857 events
Ningbo
History of Zhejiang
Naval battles involving China
Naval battles involving Portugal
1857 in Portugal
History of Hong Kong
Military history of Guangdong
Military history of Macau
Portuguese Macau
Piracy in China
Naval battles involving pirates